The École pratique des hautes études, abbreviated EPHE, is a Grand Établissement in Paris, France. It is highly selective, and counted among France's most prestigious research and higher education institutions. It is a constituent college of the elite Université PSL (together with ENS Ulm, Paris Dauphine or Ecole des Mines). 
Its degrees in religious studies and in history count among the best in the world. Closely linked to École française d'Extrême-Orient and Institut français du Proche-Orient, EPHE has formed continuously world-class experts in Asian and Islamic studies and among them investment bankers, diplomat and military officers specialized in these areas.

Particularly, leading researchers in military strategy have taught in EPHE for more than a century, such as, by example, Hervé Coutau-Bégarie.

Moreover, famous researchers in natural sciences (especially neurosciences and chemistry) teach and taught in EPHE (among them Jean Baptiste Charcot and Marcellin Berthelot). Highly regarded for its top level in both natural and human sciences, EPHE has relations and exchange programs with world-renowned institutions such as Cambridge, Princeton, and Al-Azhar.

Overview 
The EPHE brings together 240 faculty members and about 3,000 students/attenders into three core departments called “Sections” : Earth and Life Sciences, Historical and Philological Sciences, and Religious Sciences. In all Sections, tutoring and immediate induction in research practice are at the core of teaching in the different degree programs. It is one of the only place in the world where so many ancient and rare oriental languages are taught.

It has headquarters in Paris, and is present in many locations in France. Teaching and research in human sciences are conducted in Paris, notably at the Sorbonne, the historical house of the former University of Paris and in the building of Maison des Sciences de l'Homme. In the Earth and Life Sciences Section, the work takes place at the EPHE's many laboratories (Paris and its region, Nancy, Dijon, Lyon, Grenoble, Montpellier, Perpignan, Toulouse, Bordeaux, Caen, Dinard, French Polynesia). EPHE is a leading place for neurosciences and A.I. related subjects.

After selective entry requirements and the validation of highly specialized courses student can obtain the Master's and Doctorate degrees, and the postdoctoral Habilitation à Diriger des Recherches. The School also offers its specific postgraduate degrees – the “Diplôme EPHE” and the “Diplôme post-doctoral” – as well as joint degrees with other universities.

The EPHE maintains extensive cooperative exchanges with universities and research institutions. Priority areas of cooperation are in Europe, the Mediterranean, Middle-East and Asia.

Présidents of EPHE 
 1990-1994 : Monique Adolphe
 1994-1998 : Bruno Neveu
 1998-2002 : Jean Baubérot
 2002-2006 : Marie-Françoise Courel
 2006-2011 : Jean-Claude Waquet
 2011-2013 : Denis Pelletier
 From 7 November 2013 : Hubert Bost

The École pratique des hautes études was established by imperial decree on 31 July 1868 at the initiative of Victor Duruy, then Minister of Education under Emperor Napoleon III. Its purpose was to introduce research in academia and, more importantly, to promote academic training through research. It was intended to promote a practical form of scholarship designed to produce knowledge and to be taught in seminars and laboratories, as was being practiced in Germany at the time. Faculty members were to be dedicated, available to students and others for collaboration, accessible, and advance a form of education dependent on a framework of a direct relationship between the master and his disciple.

The School originally had four Sections: first established were Mathematics, Physics, and Chemistry; Natural Sciences and Physiology; Philological and Historical Sciences. The Economics Section followed in 1869, but was not developed. The Religious Sciences Section was added in 1886.

Section VI, called Economic and Social Sciences, was founded after the Second World War. This section included the study of anthropology, and the French made substantial contributions to these fields, particularly in the structuralism of Claude Lévi-Strauss and others. Their scholars were doing research in South America, Africa and Southeast Asia. There was also research in ethnopsychoanalysis and ethnopsychiatry, particularly by Georges Devereux, who joined the Section in 1963 and influenced more than a generation of scholars. In 1975 Section VI was separated to establish a new school, the École des hautes études en sciences sociales (EHESS).

The institution has been reorganized into three Sections: Earth and Life Sciences, Historical and Philological Sciences, Religious Sciences. Many renowned scholars have lectured at the EPHE or worked in its laboratories. We may cite the following:
Émile Benveniste (1928-1975), Fernand Braudel (1938-1953), Claude Bernard, André Berthelot (Vice-President), Marcellin Berthelot, Michel Bréal (1893-1913), Paul Broca, Jean-Baptiste Charcot, Henry Corbin (1938-1977), Georges Dumézil (1933-1967), Lucien Febvre (1943-1947), Étienne Gilson (1930-1941), Marcel Granet (1930-1939), Joseph Halévy (1887-1916), Bernard Halpern, Alexandre Kojève (1933-1939), Alexandre Koyré (1931-1961), Camille-Ernest Labrousse (1936-1952), Claude Lévi-Strauss (1950-1967), Sylvain Lévi, Alfred Loisy, Auguste Longnon (1887-1911), Gaston Maspero (1872-1915), Louis Massignon (1932-1957), Marcel Mauss (1930-1938), Gabriel Monod (1887-1911), Gaston Paris (1887-1904), Lucie Randoin, Jean Rouch (1959-1992), Émile Roux, Ferdinand de Saussure, Rolf Stein, William Henry Waddington, Henri Wallon...

Recent developments 

Since 2006, the EPHE has been setting up specialized centers which draw on the same scientific resources of the Sections, but whose primary purpose is to develop disciplinary expertise and vocational training, and to disseminate scholarly knowledge. 
Three institutes have been established to date : The European Institute of Religious Sciences (IESR), the Pacific Coral Reef Institute (IRCP)  and the Transdisciplinary Institute for the Study of Aging (ITEV).

More recently the EPHE has undertaken, as one of nine project sponsors, to create a new research campus in the human and social sciences, the “Campus Condorcet”. Finally, the school has joined PSL, Paris Sciences et Lettres in December 2014.

Training 

Courses at the EPHE are taught in accordance with the institution's founding educational principle: to train in research by means of adapted practice in lectures, seminars or lab sessions, in the following areas: Earth and Life Sciences; Historical and Philological Sciences; Religious Sciences.

This tradition, which has endured since the founding of the EPHE, is at the root of the EPHE's main vocation in preparing for research degrees today.

Studies programs 
Two institution-specific postgraduate degrees (in each of the three Sections): “Diplôme de l’EPHE”, “Diplôme post-doctoral de l’EPHE”;
Two master's degrees: The Master in Biology, Health, Environment (research degree, 3 specialties), The Master in Historical, Philological and Religious Sciences (Religious Sciences and Society, European, Mediterranean and Asian Sciences);
The Doctorate, in three subjects areas prepared at the same Doctoral School: Integrated Systems, Biodiversity and Environment (“SIEB”), History, Documents and Texts (“HTD”), Religions and Thought Systems (“RSP”).
The EPHE also confers the Habilitation à diriger des recherches (HDR) and offers joint university degrees (“DIU”) in collaboration with other institutions.

Earth and Life Sciences 
The Earth and Life Sciences Section groups faculty and laboratories in Paris and throughout France. All laboratories have joint research units in place with other institutions (universities, CNRS, INSERM, INRIA, MNHN). One laboratory is in French Polynesia on the island of Moorea, where the EPHE has a research station. The School also has a station in coastal geomorphology in Dinard on the coast of Brittany. The Section's research is carried out within four networks: environment and cellular regulation; neurosciences; environment and Society; biodiversity dynamics.

Historical and Philological Sciences 
The Historical and Philological Sciences Section covers the study of languages, the explanation and commentary of documentary sources, written and book history, and the history of knowledge. Geographically, the emphasis is on the Mediterranean, Asia and Europe, where writing was earliest developed. It remains a field of choice for philological and, more generally, scholarly criticism of written and unwritten sources, aimed at resolving questions of language and history. The Section may also be regarded as one large laboratory devoted to the study of works, cultures and power systems in periods preceding contemporary times, and reaching back over a very long time span within a vast Eurasian area.

In 2010, the Section included 92 full professors and lecturers, and it welcomes every year a large number of foreign scholars as guest fellows.

Topics covered by the Historical and Philological Sciences Section fall into eight broad categories: 
Ancient Near and Middle East;
Classical Antiquity;
Muslim worlds;
History and Philology of Medieval Period;
Modern and contemporary History of the West;
India and the Far East;
History of the Arts and Archeology;
Linguistics.

Historical and Philological Sciences Publications : The Historical and Philological Sciences Section publishes two collections at Editions Honoré Champion: 
 Bibliothèque de l’École des hautes études, Historical and Philological Sciences;
 Advanced studies in contemporary history).
It also publishes six other collections at the publisher Droz Publisher:
Advanced studies in numismatics;
Advanced oriental studies, divided in two series : Near and Middle East, Far East;
Advanced studies of the Greco-Roman world;
Advanced studies in comparative Islamic and oriental history;
Advanced studies of medieval and modern times;
History and civilization of the book.

Religious Sciences 
Established in 1886, the Religious Sciences Section is reputed for its original scholarship in the subject of religions, which it examines in a secular and cross-cultural spirit. By emphasizing comparative and interdisciplinary study, it is the only academic body in France to cover this field so extensively, using a wide range of scientific approaches.
The Section's teaching in the area of research extends into the most diverse cultural and linguistic fields, from Antiquity to modern and contemporary times. Strongly committed to the philological tradition, it also naturally draws on disciplines or resources as diverse and complementary as history, archeology, iconology, law, philosophy, ethnology, anthropology and sociology, as well as the cinema and new technologies.

The Section included 54 full professors and 12 lecturers in 2010, and it welcomes every year a large number of foreign scholars as guest fellows.
Topics covered may be grouped in nine broad categories: 
Religious ethnology (Africa, Americas, Europe, Australia/Oceania);
Religions of Asia;
Polytheistic Religions of the Ancient World;
Judaism;
Christianity and its margins;
Islam;
Laicities and Religions in the Contemporary World;

The Religious Sciences Section publishes two collections: 
The "Bibliothèque de l'École des hautes études", Religious Sciences (BEHE, SR), published by Brepols, which includes two series: History and prosopography of the Religious Sciences Section and Sources and documents.
The Conferences of the EPHE, published by Le Cerf. Of interest to both specialists and the educated general public, this recently created collection notably includes transcripts of lectures given at the School by guest research fellows.

Doctoral School 
The Doctoral School is also responsible for the attribution of scholarships, grants and financial aid. It implements the EPHE's doctoral studies program in accordance with the plan defined in the institution's quadriennal contract. It operates with other services of the EPHE such as the Education and International Relations divisions.
The Doctoral School is organized along three subject areas: 
Integrated Systems, Environment and Biodiversity;
Religions and Thought Systems;
History, Texts and Documents.

See also
 :Category:École pratique des hautes études alumni
 :Category:Academic staff of the École pratique des hautes études

References

External links
EPHE official site
IESR official site
Annuaire of the École pratique des hautes études, Religious Sciences Section
Annuaire of the École pratique des hautes études, Historical and Philological Sciences Section
Annuaires of the École pratique des hautes études, Digital archive
EHESS official site
CNRS official site
INSERM official site
INRA official site
MNHN official site

Grands établissements
Schools in Paris
University of Paris
Educational institutions established in 1868
1868 establishments in France